Arctic Manhunt is a 1949 American adventure film directed by Ewing Scott and starring Mikel Conrad, Carol Thurston and Wally Cassell.

Plot
Insurance agents head to the icy wilderness to collect an ex-con in possession of $250,000 in stolen funds.

Cast
 Mikel Conrad as Mike Jarvis
 Carol Thurston as Narana
 Wally Cassell as Tooyuk

Production
60% of the film was shot on location in the Arctic over a four-month period.

References

External links

1949 films
1949 adventure films
American adventure films
American black-and-white films
Films directed by Ewing Scott
1940s American films